Sikandarabad may refer to:

 Sikandarabad, Bhopal, a village in Madhya Pradesh, India
 Sikandrabad, a town in Uttar Pradesh, India
 Secunderabad, a city in Telangana, India
 Sikandarabad, Gilgit–Baltistan, a village in Pakistan
 Sikandrabad Colony, Abbottabad, a locality in Pakistan
 Gulshan-e-Sikandarabad, a neighbourhood of Karachi in Pakistan
 Sikandarabad, Sindh, a union council of Khairpur District, Pakistan